Durevius is a small genus of assassin bugs restricted to the island of Madagascar. Five species are known.

Partial list of species
Durevius piceus Villiers 1962 
Durevius tuberculatus Villiers 1950
Durevius usingeri Villiers 1960

References

Reduviidae
Cimicomorpha genera
Insects of Madagascar
Endemic fauna of Madagascar